The White House communications director or White House director of communications, also known officially as Assistant to the President for Communications, is part of the senior staff of the president of the United States. The officeholder is responsible for developing and promoting the agenda of the president and leading its media campaign.

The director, along with their staff, works on major political speeches such as the inaugural address and the State of the Union Address. The communications director, who is appointed by and serves at the pleasure of the president, without the need for United States Senate confirmation, is usually given an office in the West Wing of the White House.

History
The White House Office of Communications was established by Herbert G. Klein in January 1969 during the Nixon administration. It was separate from the Office of the Press Secretary from 1969 to 1974.

Role and responsibilities

Historically, the position of White House communications director is given to a senior public relations staff member of the candidate's campaign staff. Often this is either the deputy campaign manager or the campaign communications director. The communications director works closely with the White House press secretary, who is typically a co-worker in the president's campaign.

As the president's voice and vision must be understood, the communications director ensures that all aspects of communications are covered to ensure that the administration's message has been delivered clearly and successfully. A communications strategy must be devised to promote the president's agenda throughout all media outlets. This can include, but certainly is not limited to, the State of the Union address, televised press conferences, statements to the press, and radio addresses. The communications office also works closely with cabinet-level departments and other executive agencies in order to create a coherent strategy, through which the president's message can be disseminated.

With the growing importance of the internet and new media in terms of presidential communication, the communications office has branched out to utilize the Internet, and more specifically social media sites such as Facebook and Twitter, in order to reach out and convey the president's vision to a larger percentage of the public.

Key staff
 Assistant to the President and White House Communications Director: Kate Bedingfield
 Deputy Assistant to the President and Principal Deputy Director of Communications: Kate Berner
 Special Assistant to the President and Deputy Director of Communications: Herbie Ziskend
 Assistant to the President and White House Press Secretary: Karine Jean-Pierre
 Deputy Assistant to the President and Principal Deputy Press Secretary: Olivia Dalton
 Special Assistant to the President and Deputy Press Secretary: Chris Meagher
 Special Assistant to the President and Deputy Press Secretary: Andrew Bates
 Deputy Assistant to the President and Director of Speechwriting: Vinay Reddy
 Deputy Assistant to the President and Director of Digital Strategy: Rob Flaherty
 Deputy Director of Platforms: Megan Coyne

Directors

References

1969 establishments in the United States
White House Communications Directors
White House Office